Ramalingesvarar Temple is a Siva temple in Kanjanur in Villupuram district in Tamil Nadu (India).

Vaippu Sthalam
It is one of the shrines of the Vaippu Sthalams sung by Tamil Saivite Nayanar Sundarar.

Presiding deity
The presiding deity is Ramalingesvarar. The Goddess is known as Soundaranayaki. Separate saniswar with foot on crow head is a deity.

Vada Kanjanur
As there is another place in the name of Kanjanur, this place is known as Vada Kanjanur (North Kanjanur). Now, this place is known as Kanjanur.

References

Hindu temples in Viluppuram district
Shiva temples in Viluppuram district